Rapl is a Czech action crime television series. It was directed by Jan Pachl, who is the author of the script and, together with Josef Viewegh, also participated in the theme.

Production
Rapl is a spin-off previous series Cirkus Bukowsky. The thirteen-part first season of the series premiered on Czech Television from 29 August 2016.

Filming for the second season began in November 2017. It also has 13 episodes, filming lasted until autumn 2018. It was broadcast in early 2019.

Awards
The series was ranked in a poll among iDNES.cz readers as the second best Czech crime series of the decade after Případy 1. oddělení.

The series was nominated for the Czech Lion awards and for the European television festival Prix Europa award.

Cast
 Hynek Čermák as Major Kuneš
 Alexej Pyško as lieutenant colonel Jan Rohan
 Lukáš Příkazký as First Lieutenant Robin Lupínek
 Lucie Žáčková as Ůieutenant Jana Slepičková
 Jan Dolanský as Captain Marek Gregor
 Tomáš Jeřábek as First Lieutenant Mácha
 Lukáš Vaculík as KáGeBák Hojzar

References

External links 
Official site
IMDB site
ČSFD site

Czech action television series
Czech crime television series
Czech thriller television series
2016 Czech television series debuts
Czech Television original programming
Czech television spin-offs